is a Japanese former professional baseball pitcher in Japan's Nippon Professional Baseball. He played with the Chiba Lotte Marines from 2011 to 2012 and from 2014 to 2016.

External links

1985 births
Living people
People from Kazuno, Akita
Baseball people from Akita Prefecture
Japanese baseball players
Nippon Professional Baseball pitchers
Chiba Lotte Marines players